Alireza Qaeminia is an Iranian philosopher and associate professor of epistemology at the Research Institute for Islamic Culture and Thought. He is a recipient of the Iranian Book of the Year Award for his book Biology of the Religious Text.

Works
 Biology of the Religious Text, 2010 
 Origin of Religion, 2002
 Revelation and Speech Acts
 Semiotics and Interpretation of the Quran
 The logic of understanding religion : an introduction to the methodology of discovering religion propositions and doctrines

References

External links
 Qaeminia at the Research Institute for Islamic Culture and Thought

Living people
21st-century Iranian philosophers
Academic staff of the Research Institute for Islamic Culture and Thought
Year of birth missing (living people)
Iran's Book of the Year Awards recipients